Njabulo Mabuza is a Swazi businessman and politician. He is the member of parliament for Khubuta inkhundla for the term from 2013 until 2018. He was the Minister for Health and Social Welfare and MP for Khubuta constituency for two terms before being replaced by Charles Myeza.

Career
Mabuza was originally a bus operator, running Mdumiseni Bus Service.
Mabuza was once the Chairman of the Public Accounts Committee, which is a parliamentary committee which regulates government spending.

Minister of Health
Mabuza was a controversial figure during his second term as Minister for Health and Social Welfare which "coincided with the collapse of the health sector in the country" with an acute shortage of drugs and medical facilities. In 2007, Mabuza banned the media from entering the Mbabane Government Hospital as criticism mounted. During his term as minister he "blamed budgetary constraints and "technical problems" for the failure to pay grants to widows and the elderly". In 2011 he was involved in a court case for allegedly failing to pay E200.

References

Swazi politicians
Living people
Health ministers of Eswatini
Government ministers of Eswatini
Swazi businesspeople
Year of birth missing (living people)